The 1944 Navy Midshipmen men's soccer team represented the United States Naval Academy during the 1944 ISFA season. It was the program's 24th season of existence. 

The 1944 season saw Navy win the ISFA national championship, and was voted by NSCAA as the number one team in the nation following the end of the season. It was Navy's third college soccer national championship. The program was coached by former Olympic gold medalist, Tom Taylor who had been coaching the program since its inception.

Schedule 

|-
!colspan=6 style="background:#00005D; color:#D4AF37;"| Regular Season
|-

Honors

All-Americans
Three players were named All-Americans by the Intercollegiate Soccer Football Association:

First-team
George Reaves, DF
Robert Kirk, MF
Arturo Callisto, FW

Second-team
R.J. Leuschner

References

Navy
Intercollegiate Soccer Football Association Championship-winning seasons
Navy Midshipmen men's soccer seasons
Navy Midshipmen men's soccer